KF Kosovari is a professional football club from Kosovo which competes in the Third League (Group B). The club is based in Bardh i Madh, Fushë Kosovë. Their home ground is the Zejnel Salihu Field which has a viewing capacity of 500.

See also
List of football clubs in Kosovo

References

Football clubs in Kosovo
Association football clubs established in 2011